Vusa Mkhaya (born 19 October 1974), is a Zimbabwean singer and songwriter best known for being a member of the award winning vocal trio, Insingizi.

Early life
Vusa Mkhaya was born on the 19th October 1974 in Bulawayo. He was raised in Bulawayo, Zimbabwe where he was introduced to Imbube music and fell in love with it. At the age of nine he was already part of the school choir. He moved to Austria in 1997, then under Insingizi when they as a group decided to further their music knowledge and enrol at a music conservatory in Graz, Austria.

Education
He attended Mahlabezulu Primary School and for his secondary education he went to Ihlathi Secondary School in the township of Tshabalala in Bulawayo and Nhlambabaloyi Secondary in Ntabazinduna. He studied music theory and Accordion at the Johann Fuchs Music Conservatorium in Graz, Austria for 3 years.

Career
He rose to fame with his much appreciated and celebrated outfit Insingizi in 2004 through the debut album, Spirit of Africa. His first music album was The Spirit of Ubuntu in 2006. He released his second solo album, Vocalism in 2012 after releasing the debut album The Spirit of Ubuntu in 2006. He then released his third solo album, Manyanyatha in 2016. In January 2018, he held a show at the Bulawayo Theatre with local singer Nkwali, dubbed From Bulawayo to the World, the show was meant to celebrate music from the city. He has also sang the theme song for the 2018 Oscar nominated film, Watu Wote.

His album, UManyanyatha was then re-released internationally on 26 June 2020 under Canadian record label Naxos, with additional songs digitally re-mastered and with a new title UManyanyatha – Songs from the Soul of Zimbabwe. Explaining how he came up with the title name for his third album:
Manyanyatha is my nickname that my uncle gave me as a kid. I am told every time music was played on radio or TV I stood up and sang along and danced. This is how the name Manyanyatha was born. So I am paying tribute to those that encouraged me to sing when I was growing up.

Awards and nominations
Nominated for an Austrian World Music Award 2015 for the album Vocalism.
Awarded the Zimbabwe Achievers Awards (UK) for Service to Music and Cultural Promotions in 2019.
Awarded with a National Arts Merit Awards (NAMA) for Outstanding Artist in the Diaspora Award in 2020.
Nominated for the Roil Bulawayo Arts Awards for Outstanding Male Artist in 2020.
Awarded with a Roil Bulawayo Arts Award for Outstanding Ambassador (worldwide) in 2021.
Nominated for the Roil Bulawayo Arts Awards for Outstanding Male Artist and Outstanding Ambassador (Worldwide) 2022.

Discography

Albums
 The Spirit of Ubuntu (2006)
 Vocalism (2012)
 Umanyanyatha (2016)
 Umanyanyatha: Songs from the Soul of Zimbabwean (2020)
 Phuma Featuring Various (2021) Supported by Open Society Initiative for Southern Africa (OSISA).
 Khanyisa (2022)

References

External links
 
Vusa Mkhaya on Discogs

Living people
1974 births
20th-century Zimbabwean male singers
People from Bulawayo
21st-century Zimbabwean male singers